Jiji Maa is an Indian drama television series produced by Jay Productions which aired on Star Bharat from 9 October 2017 to 18 February 2019. Adapted from the Telugu soap opera Lakshmi Kalyanam, it starred Tanvi Dogra, Dishank Arora, Bhavika Sharma and Shubhashish Jha. The story of the series is set in Jaipur, revolving around two sisters.

Plot
Falguni and Niyati Purohit are sisters from a poor household supported by their mother. Their mother dies and leaves Niyati in Falguni's care telling her that she is now Niyati's Jiji Maa (Sister Mother). Falguni works to fund Niyati's education, remaining illiterate herself.

Years later 
A grown-up Falguni and Niyati meet Uttara Devi Rawat, a bad-tempered and arrogant woman who hates poor people. Falguni gets into a fight with Uttara and later apologises to her driver Suresh. A humiliated Uttara vows to take revenge from the sisters. Suresh, who is in fact Uttara's elder son Suyash, falls in love with Falguni. Niyati tries to commit suicide but is stopped by Falguni who is shocked to find out that Niyati is pregnant with her ex-boyfriend's child. Her ex-boyfriend is revealed to be Vidhaan, Uttara devi's younger son.

Falguni helps Vidhaan and Niyati reunite. Uttara is forced to accept them after Vidhaan tries to commit suicide. It is then revealed that Uttara is in fact Suyash's maternal aunt and step-mother. She finds a will bequeathing the entire Rawat property to Suyash and plots to marry him to a sterile woman so he can never have children who can inherit.

Falguni and Suresh fall in love. Uttara demands Falguni marry her older son Suyash and sign an agreement that she will never bear children and only then will she agree to Niyati and Vidhaan's marriage. Falguni agrees and breaks up with Suresh. Niyati tries to stop Falguni but fails. On the wedding day, Suyash and Falguni discover they are marrying each other and are shocked.

Falguni tries to win Suyash's heart but all in vain. She starts working with the kalaakaars at the Rawats' textile factory and wins them over helping them get their jobs back from Uttara, thus impressing Suyash. She then helps Suyash track down his biological mother Gayatri who had been accused of murder and is hated by Suyash's father Jayant because of misunderstandings created by Uttara. This brings them closer and he accepts that she must have had a reason for rejecting him.

A child named Chiku is brought to Rawat House and is revealed to be Suyash's illegitimate child with Shreya. Shreya fakes her death and asks Falguni to promise her she will raise Chiku as her own and not have any children of her own. Uttara takes Falguni to Mumbai for her hysterectomy where Falguni sees Shreya is alive and well and discovers Shreya to be working with Uttara. She devises an elaborate plan to expose Uttara's evil intentions before the family. Eventually, she succeeds by faking Vidhaan's death which causes a distraught Uttara to confess her crimes. She is sent to prison but soon escapes. However, when Vidhaan rejects her, she becomes upset and is shown to have fallen off a cliff.

Falguni's long lost twin sister, Piyali, enters their lives wanting to ruin Falguni. Piyali takes over the Rawats' textile mill and invites Uttara to join the company. She is able to turn Niyati against Falguni. When Suyash is diagnosed with lung cancer, he decides to distance himself from Falguni. Piyali starts getting close to him helping him with his treatment and upsetting Falguni. Suyash serves Falguni with divorce papers despite still being in love with her. Falguni discovers that Uttara and Piyali fabricated Suyash's cancer diagnosis but is unable to inform him in time and Suyash ends up marrying Piyali. Falguni marries Piyali's lover Karma to make her jealous and Pyaali finally caves in ready to leave Suyash. Uttara tries to manipulate Karma into staying with Falguni but Falguni helps him see the truth. Piyali leaves the Rawats' house with Karma and Falguni and Suyash reunite after many hurdles.

Suyash and Vidhaan's aunt Haryali visits the family and tells them that according to her dream, the Rawat family should have a child in ten months or the family will be destroyed. It is revealed that Niyati's uterus was damaged in an accident and she is unlikely to become pregnant. Haryali emotionally manipulates her into leaving Vidhaan for his own betterment. Uttara tries to delay Falguni and Suyash's wedding but Falguni becomes pregnant and gives birth to a boy named Govind. However, Govind supposedly dies in an accident. Suyash blames Falguni and accuses of her only caring about being a Jiji Maa to her sister. He throws her out of the house and Niyati follows her sister and leaves Vidhaan.

7 years later 
Falguni is one of the most prominent businesswomen with her company Jiji Maa Textiles and has become more modern while Suyash has become an arrogant businessman. Govind is revealed to have been raised by local goons Chamki and Devraj as Laddoo, a pickpocket.

Uttara is living with Falguni and Niyati and is shown to be mentally unsound. A rival businessman, Abhishek, tries to damage Suyash's reputation but fails. He teams up with Uttara who has been faking her insanity and wants to harm Suyash. They hire Devraj to kill Suyash. Falguni manages to save him every time. After failing repeatedly, Devraj eventually kills his own wife to save himself. Falguni finds her while she's dying and Chamki tells her that Laddoo isn't actually their own child.

Falguni realises Govind is her child and goes to tell Suyash but he sends her away. After Abhishiek contacts Falguni and tells her that he has Laddoo and that she has to kill Suyash in order to get Laddoo. Falguni pretends to have killed Suyash and goes to get Laddoo but Devraj and Abhishek capture her and plan on killing her. Suyash saves them. The police capture Abhishek and Devraj. Falguni, Suyash and Govind are reunited.

Suyash throws a party to celebrate the return of their child. Uttara shows up and tries to kill them. Her plan backfires with the help of Laddoo and Uttara dies because of a fire accident. The show takes a quick leap, where the Rawat family is shown to be living happily. Niyati reveals that she and Vidhaan plan on adopting a baby and this is how the show Jiji Maa ends.

Cast

Main
Tanvi Dogra as Falguni Purohit Rawat – Niyati and Piyali's sister; Suyash's wife; Govind's mother (2017–2019)
 Dishank Arora as Suyash Rawat – Jayant and Gayatri's son; Uttara's nephew and step-son; Vidhaan's half-brother; Falguni's husband; Govind's father (2017–2019)
 Bhavika Sharma as Niyati Purohit Rawat – Falguni and Piyali's sister; Vidhaan's wife (2017–2019)

recurring
 Shubhashish Jha as Vidhaan Rawat – Jayant and Uttara's son; Suyash's half-brother; Niyati's husband
Rajeev Paul as Jayant Rawat – Haryali's brother; Gayatri and Uttara's husband; Suyash and Vidhaan's father; Govind's grandfather
Pallavi Pradhan as Uttara Choksi Rawat – Gayatri's sister; Jayant's second wife; Suyash's aunt and step-mother; Vidhaan's mother
Urfi Javed / Charu Asopa as Shravani "Piyali" Purohit – Falguni and Niyati's long-lost sister; Karma's love interest
Naveen Pandita as Karma – Piyali's love interest
Krutika Desai Khan as Haryali Rawat – Jayant's sister
Gauransh Sharma as Govind "Laddoo" Rawat – Falguni and Suyash's son
Randheer Rai as Abhishek Sanghvi – Suyash's business rival
Rashmi Singh as Shreya – Suyash's college friend
Ayesha Vindhara as Chiku – Shreya's daughter
Anjali Gupta as Gayatri Choksi Rawat – Uttara's sister; Jayant's first wife; Suyash's mother; Govind's grandmother

Adaptations

References

2017 Indian television series debuts
Hindi-language television shows
Indian drama television series
Star Bharat original programming
Television shows set in Jaipur
2019 Indian television series endings